Robert Adam Lyon (baptized 4 October 1829 – June 6, 1901) was a Canadian businessman and Liberal member of the Ontario Provincial Parliament from 1878 to 1884 and from 1885 to 1890.

He was born in Glasgow, Scotland in 1829 and came to Halton County, Ontario in Upper Canada with his parents in 1832. With his brother William Durie Lyon, he opened a general store in Milton. In 1866, he became involved in the development of timber on Manitoulin Island. He established a settlement at Michael's Bay on the island.

In 1878, he became the MLA for Algoma in a by-election, replacing Simon James Dawson. He was re-elected in 1879 and 1883, but resigned in 1884 over allegations of irregularities during the election. In 1885, he was elected in the new riding of Algoma East. In 1888, his business went into bankruptcy and he was defeated in the election of 1890. He died in Sault Ste. Marie, Ontario in 1901.

External links

Biography at the Dictionary of Canadian Biography Online

1829 births
1901 deaths
Ontario Liberal Party MPPs
People from Algoma District